The plantar nerves are a pair of nerves innervating the sole of the foot.  They arise from the posterior branch of the tibial nerve.

Medial plantar nerve

The medial plantar nerve supplies: the abductor hallucis, the flexor digitorum brevis, the flexor hallucis brevis and the first lumbrical. Cutaneous distribution of the medial plantar nerve is to the medial sole and medial three and one half toes, including the nail beds on the dorsum (like the median nerve in the hand). Mnemonic LAFF muscles (pronounced "laugh") L – first Lumbrical, A – Abductor Hallucis, F – Flexor digitorum brevis, F – flexor hallucis brevis

Lateral plantar nerve

The lateral plantar nerve supplies quadratus plantae, flexor digiti minimi brevis, adductor hallucis, the dorsal and plantar interossei, three lateral lumbricals and abductor digiti minimi. Cutaneous innervation is to the lateral sole and lateral one and one half toes (like the ulnar nerve).

References

Foot
Medical mnemonics